John Dunhead may refer to:

John Dunhead (fl. 1394–1397), MP for Huntingdon (UK Parliament constituency)
John Dunhead (fl. 1395–1397), MP for Huntingdon (UK Parliament constituency), probably the son of the other MP